Požela is a Lithuanian surname that may refer to
Juras Požela (1982–2016), Lithuanian politician
Karl Pojello (Karolis Požėla, 1893–1954), Lithuanian professional wrestler
Karolis Požela (1896–1926), Lithuanian communist executed in 1926

Lithuanian-language surnames